Gomphonemopsis is a genus of diatoms belonging to the family Rhoicospheniaceae.

The genus was first described by Linda Medlin in 1986.

Species:
 Gomphonemopsis exigua
 Gomphonemopsis pseudexigua

References

Cymbellales
Diatom genera